Junagarh or Junagadh was a princely state in Gujarat ruled by the Muslim Babi dynasty in British India, until its integration into the Union of India in 1948.

History
Muhammad Sher Khan Babai was the founder of the Babi Pashtun dynasty of Junagarh in 1654. His descendants, the Babi Nawabs of Junagarh, conquered large territories in southern Saurashtra. 

However, during the collapse of the Mughal Empire, the Babis became involved in a struggle with the Gaekwad dynasty of the Maratha Empire over control of Gujarat during the reign of the local Mohammad Mahabat Khanji I. Mohammad Khan Bahadur Khanji I declared independence from the Mughal governor of Gujarat subah, and founded the state of Junagarh in 1730. This allowed the Babi to retain sovereignty of Junagarh and other princely states. During the reign of his heir Junagarh was a tributary to the Maratha Empire, until it came under British suzerainty in 1807 under Mohammad Hamid Khanji I, following the Second Anglo-Maratha War.

In 1807, Junagarh became a British protectorate and the East India Company took control of the state. By 1818, the Saurashtra area, along with other princely states of Kathiawar, were separately administrated under the Kathiawar Agency by British India.

In 1947, upon the independence and partition of India, the last Babi dynasty ruler of the state, Muhammad Mahabat Khanji III, decided to merge Junagarh into the newly formed Pakistan.

Rulers

The Nawabs of Junagarh belonged to Pathan Babi or Babai (Pashtun tribe). They were granted a 13 gun salute by the British authorities:

 1730–1758 : Mohammad Bahadur Khanji I or Mohammad Sher Khan Babai
 1758–1774: Mohammad Mahabat Khan I
 1774–1811: Mohammad Hamid Khan I
 1811–1840: Mohammad Bahadur Khan II
 1840–1851: Mohammad Hamid Khan II
 1851–1882: Mohammad Mahabat Khan  II
 1882–1892: Mohammad Bahadur Khan III
 1892–1911: Mohammad Rasul Khan
 1911–1948: Mohammad Mahabat Khan III (last ruler before the integration of Junagarh to India)

Rebellion

Koli rebellion in Junagarh raised by Mansa Khant during time of Nawab Sher Khan the first ruler of Junagarh. He was against Mughal Rule, Made Uparkot Fort his centre. He made a series of raids in surrounding villages and cities. Nawab was unsuccessful to control the rebellion. Mansa Khant occupied the Uparkot for thirteen months and carried out numerous raids mostly in countryside. Nawab started campaign against Khant. Nawab was assisted by king of Gondal State Thakur Sahib Haloji Jadeja and Arab Jamadar Sheikh Abdullah Zubeidi. The combined forces defeated the Khant and captured Uparkot and burnt down the rebellion.

Annexation by India

In 1947, Shah Nawaz Bhutto joined the council of ministers of Nawab Muhammad Mahabat Khan III, and in May became his dewan or prime minister.

With the independence of India in 1947, the princely states were left by the British to decide whether to accede to one of the newly independent states of India or Pakistan or to remain independent. The Constitutional Advisor to the Nawab, Nabi Baksh, indicated to Lord Mountbatten that he was recommending that Junagarh should join India. However, upon the advice of Dewan Bhutto, on 15 August 1947, the Nawab announced that Junagarh had acceded to Pakistan. On 16 September, the Government of Pakistan accepted the accession.

India sent its military into Junagarh while the Nawab of Junagarh was in Pakistan and captured the state of junagarh overthrowing Nawab and the rights of princely states. The  Annexation of Junagarh into India led the Nawab Muhammad Mahabat Khan III of Junagarh (erstwhile Babi Nawab dynasty of Junagarh) left to live in Sindh, Pakistan.

Pakistan's claim
Pakistan's government has maintained its territorial claim on Junagadh, along with Manavadar and Sir Creek in Gujarat, on its official political maps.

See also
Annexation of Junagarh
Manavadar State
V. P. Menon
Political integration of India
Pathans of Gujarat
Junagadh State Railway

References

External links

Classic Gallery of Indian Numismatics
Heraldry of the princely states of Gujarat

1730 establishments in India
1948 disestablishments in India
Bombay Presidency
Former protectorates
Historical Indian regions
Kathiawar Agency
Muslim princely states of India
Pashtun dynasties
States and territories disestablished in 1948